Syrtis Major may refer to:

 Syrtis Major Planum, ancient volcanic area on Mars
 Gulf of Sidra, body of water on the coast of Libya